Imogen Bain (17 April 1959 – 5 July 2014) was an English stage and screen actress.

Early years
Bain was born in London, England, to Jessie Evans, an actress, and Donald Bain, a director. Initially stunted as a youth with dyslexia, Bain went on to study at the Guildhall School of Music and Drama. In 1973, she starred in an episode of Thirty-Minute Theatre on the BBC.

Career
Bain eventually followed her parents into show business, making a name for herself on the British stage. She made her West End debut in Daisy Pulls It Off at the Globe Theatre.

Bain also made appearances in film, appearing in Robin Hood: Prince of Thieves and The Phantom of the Opera’’. Her television work, included roles in Casualty and The Sarah Jane Adventures''.

She also taught at the Actor's Centre in Covent Garden and, with Andrea Brooks, formed the Good Luck Company.

Personal life
Bain was married to actor Simon Holmes.

Death
Bain died on 5 July 2014. She was 55.

Filmography

References

External links 

1959 births
2014 deaths
British stage actresses
Actresses from London